This is a complete list of high schools in the U.S. state of Rhode Island.

Bristol County
Mount Hope High School, Bristol

Barrington

Barrington High School
Barrington Christian Academy
St. Andrew's School

Kent County

Coventry High School, Coventry
East Greenwich High School, East Greenwich
West Warwick High School, West Warwick

West Greenwich

Exeter-West Greenwich Senior High School
The Greene School

Warwick

Bishop Hendricken High School
Pilgrim High School
Rocky Hill School
Toll Gate High School

Newport County

Rogers High School, Newport
Tiverton High School, Tiverton

Middletown

Middletown High School
St. George's School

Portsmouth

Portsmouth Abbey School
Portsmouth High School (also serves Little Compton)

Providence County

Burrillville High School, Harrisville (a village of Burrillville)
Central Falls High School, Central Falls
Cumberland High School, Cumberland
Lincoln Senior High School, Lincoln
North Providence High School, North Providence
North Smithfield High School, North Smithfield
Ponaganset High School, Glocester
Scituate High School, North Scituate
Smithfield High School, Smithfield

Cranston

Cranston High School East
Cranston High School West
Cranston Area Career and Technical Center

East Providence

East Providence Career & Technical Center
East Providence High School
Providence Country Day School
St. Mary Academy – Bay View

Johnston

Johnston High School
Trinity Christian Academy

Pawtucket

Blackstone Academy Charter School
St. Raphael Academy
Shea High School
William E. Tolman High School

Providence

Achievement First Providence High School
Central High School
Classical High School
Dr. Jorge Alvarez High School
Highlander Charter School
Hope High School
Juanita Sanchez Educational Complex
La Salle Academy
Lincoln School
Moses Brown School
Mount Pleasant High School
New England Academy of Torah
Paul Cuffee Charter School
Providence Career and Tech Academy
Rhode Island School for the Deaf
Textron Chamber of Commerce Charter School
St. Patrick Academy
School One
Time Squared Academy
Wheeler School

Woonsocket

Beacon Charter High School for the Arts
Mount Saint Charles Academy
Woonsocket High School

Washington County

Block Island School, New Shoreham (Block Island) (K-12)
Chariho High School, Wood River Junction (a village of Richmond, also serves Charlestown and Hopkinton) 
North Kingstown High School, North Kingstown (also serves Jamestown)
Westerly High School, Westerly

Narragansett

Middlebridge School
Narragansett High School (also serves Jamestown)

Wakefield

Prout School
South Kingstown High School

See also

List of school districts in Rhode Island
Providence County, Rhode Island schools
Rhode Island schools

References

External links
List of Rhode Island high schools from SchoolTree.org

Rhode Island
High schools